Lauck is a surname. Notable people with the surname include:

Chester Lauck (1902–1980), American radio and film actor
Gary Lauck (born 1953), American neo-Nazi activist and publisher
Gerd Lauck (1931–2005), German footballer 
Hans Joachim Lauck (born 1937), Minister for Heavy Plant and Machinery Construction in the German Democratic Republic
Jennifer Lauck (born  1963), American author, essayist, speaker and writing instructor
M. Hannah Lauck  (born 1963), American judge
Reinhard Lauck (1946–1997), German footballer

See also
Boillot & Lauck, was a long term architectural partnership between Elmer R. Boillot and Jesse F. Lauck in Kansas City, Missouri

References